Stephen Wright (born 4 February 1952) is an English former first-class cricketer.

Wright was born at Muswell Hill in February 1952 and later studied at Clare College at the University of Cambridge. While studying at Cambridge, he played first-class cricket for Cambridge University Cricket Club in 1973, making ten appearances, which included playing that seasons University Match against Oxford. Playing as a batsman who was utilised as both an opening and middle order batsman in the Cambridge side, he scored 277 runs at an average of 14.57, with a highest score of 41. Wright played for Cambridge the following season, making a single List A one-day appearance against Sussex at Hove in the Benson & Hedges Cup; batting in the middle order, he was dismissed by Chris Waller for 0.

References

External links

1952 births
Living people
People from Muswell Hill
Alumni of Clare College, Cambridge
English cricketers
Cambridge University cricketers